The Hairy is an epithet applied to:

John the Hairy, a 16th-century holy fool (yurodivy) of the Russian Orthodox Church
Wilfred the Hairy (died 897), Count of Urgell, Cerdanya, Barcelona, Girona, Besalú, and Ausona

See also
 List of people known as the Bald
 Henk Overgoor (1944–2020), Dutch footballer nicknamed the Hairdresser
 Hairy Bikers, British television cooks Simon King and David Myers who travel by motorbike

Lists of people by epithet